Manoj Rawat is an Indian politician from Uttarakhand and a former Member of the Uttarakhand Legislative Assembly. He represented the Kedarnath (Uttarakhand Assembly constituency). He is a member of the Indian National Congress.

Electoral performance

References

3. केदारनाथ के विधायक देंगे छत्तीसगढ़ विधानसभा में व्याख्यान
https://www.jagran.com/uttarakhand/chamoli-kedarnath-mla-manoj-rawat-18932258.html

External links
 
 

Living people
20th-century Indian politicians
Indian National Congress politicians from Uttarakhand
People from Rudraprayag district
Members of the Uttarakhand Legislative Assembly
Uttarakhand MLAs 2017–2022
Year of birth missing (living people)